Together Alone may refer to:

Music
Together Alone, an album by Crowded House and also the closing track from that album
Together Alone (Donnie Iris album), an album by Australian rock band Donnie Iris
Together Alone (Anouk album), an album by Dutch singer Anouk
Together Alone (Anthony Braxton and Joseph Jarman album), an album by American jazz saxophonists Joseph Jarman and Anthony Braxton
Together Alone, a 2008 album by Chris While and Julie Matthews
"Together Alone", a single from Melanie Safka's album Stoneground Words
Together Alone (Alex Hepburn album), a debut album by British singer Alex Hepburn

Other
Together Alone (film), a 1991 film written and directed by P.J. Castellaneta
Together Alone, a book by Ron Falconer relating to Caroline Island

See also
 Alone Together (disambiguation)